In control theory, the state-transition matrix is a matrix whose product with the state vector  at an initial time  gives  at a later time .  The state-transition matrix can be used to obtain the general solution of linear dynamical systems.

Linear systems solutions
The state-transition matrix is used to find the solution to a general state-space representation of a linear system in the following form
 ,
Using the state-transition matrix , the solution is given by:
 

The first term is known as the zero-input response and represents how the system's state would evolve in the absence of any input.  The second term is known as the zero-state response and defines how the inputs impact the system.

Peano–Baker series
The most general transition matrix is given by the Peano–Baker series

where  is the  identity matrix. This matrix converges uniformly and absolutely to a solution that exists and is unique.

Other properties
The state transition matrix  satisfies the following relationships:

1. It is continuous and has continuous derivatives.

3.  for all  .

4.  for all .

5. It satisfies the differential equation  with initial conditions .

6. The state-transition matrix , given by
 
where the  matrix  is the fundamental solution matrix that satisfies
  with initial condition .

7. Given the state  at any time , the state at any other time  is given by the mapping

Estimation of the state-transition matrix

The corresponding solutions provide the  columns of matrix . Now, from property 4, 
 for all . The state-transition matrix must be determined before analysis on the time-varying solution can continue.

See also 
 Magnus expansion
 Liouville's formula

References

Further reading
 
 

Classical control theory